Concerts for the People of Kampuchea was a series of concerts featuring Wings, Queen, The Clash, The Pretenders, The Who, Elvis Costello, and many more artists which took place at the Hammersmith Odeon in London during December 1979 to raise money for the victims of war-torn Cambodia. The event was organised by Paul McCartney and Kurt Waldheim, and it involved artists such as McCartney and The Who as well as punk acts like The Clash and the Pretenders. The last of the concerts was the last concert of Wings. An album and EP were released in 1981, and the best of the concerts were released as a film, Concert for Kampuchea.

Rockestra was a McCartney-led supergroup of at least 30 English rockers. The back cover of the LP states the Rockestra performers include:
John Bonham, Billy Bremner, Gary Brooker, Howie Casey, Tony Dorsey, Dave Edmunds, Steve Holley, James Honeyman-Scott, Steve Howard, Kenney Jones, John Paul Jones, Laurence Juber, Denny Laine, Ronnie Lane, Linda McCartney, Paul McCartney, Robert Plant, Thadeus Richard, Bruce Thomas, Pete Townshend

Concerts

26 December
Queen

27 December
Ian Dury and the Blockheads (with guest Mick Jones on "Sweet Gene Vincent")
Matumbi
The Clash

28 December
The Pretenders
The Specials
The Who

29 December
Elvis Costello & The Attractions
Rockpile (with guest Robert Plant on "Little Sister")
Wings
Rockestra

Selected set lists

Queen
Jailhouse Rock
We Will Rock You (fast version)
Let Me Entertain You
Somebody to Love
If You Can't Beat Them
Mustapha
Death on Two Legs
Killer Queen
I'm in Love with My Car
Get Down, Make Love
You're My Best Friend
Save Me
Now I'm Here
Don't Stop Me Now
Spread Your Wings
Love of My Life
'39
Keep Yourself Alive
Drums solo
Guitar solo with parts of Silent Night
Brighton Rock reprise
Crazy Little Thing Called Love
Bohemian Rhapsody
Tie Your Mother Down
Sheer Heart Attack
We Will Rock You
We Are the Champions
God Save the Queen (tape)

Ian Dury & The Blockheads

Clevor Trevor
Inbetweenies
Don't Ask Me
Reasons To Be Cheerful
Sink My Boats
Waiting For Your Taxi
This Is What We Find
Mischief
What A Waste
Hit Me With Your Rhythm Stick
Sweet Gene Vincent

The Clash 

Clash City Rockers
Brand New Cadillac
Safe European Home
Jimmy Jazz
Clampdown
The Guns of Brixton
Train in Vain
Wrong ‘Em Boyo
Koka Kola
(White Man) In Hammersmith Palais
Stay Free 
Bankrobber
Janie Jones
Complete Control
Armagideon Time
London Calling

The Specials
(Dawning Of a) New Era
Do The Dog
Monkey Man
Concrete Jungle
Too Hot
Doesn't Make It Alright
Too Much Too Young
Guns Of Navarone
Little Bitch
A Message To You Rudy
Nite Club
Gangsters
Longshot Kick The Bucket
Skinhead Moonstomp
Madness

The Who

Substitute
I Can't Explain
Baba O'Riley
The Punk and the Godfather
My Wife
Sister Disco
Behind Blue Eyes
Music Must Change
Drowned
Who Are You
5.15
Pinball Wizard
See Me Feel Me
Long Live Rock
My Generation
I'm a Man
Hoochie Coochie Man
Sparks
I Can See for Miles
I Don't Want To Be an Old Man
Won't Get Fooled Again
Summertime Blues
Dancing In The Streets
Dance It Away
The Real Me

Rockpile

Three Time Loser
Crawling From The Wreckage
Little Sister

Wings

Got to Get You into My Life
Getting Closer
Every Night
Again And Again And Again
I've Had Enough
No Words
Cook of the House
Old Siam, Sir
Maybe I'm Amazed
The Fool on the Hill
Hot As Sun
Spin It On
Twenty Flight Rock
Go Now
Arrow Through Me
Coming Up
Goodnight Tonight
Yesterday
Mull of Kintyre
Band on the Run

Rockestra

Rockestra Theme
Let It Be
Lucille
Rockestra Theme (reprise)

See also 
Concerts for the People of Kampuchea, the album and the EP about the concerts.
Concert for Kampuchea, the film about the concerts.

References

Benefit concerts in the United Kingdom
1979 in Cambodia
The Clash
Queen (band) concert tours
Wings (band) concert tours
1979 in British music
1979 in London